José Bernardino de Portugal e Castro (20 May 1780 - 26 February 1840) was a Portuguese marquis and the President of the Council of Ministers from 4 to 5 November 1836. He was the 5th Marquis of Valença.

Origin
He was a distant relative of reigning family, being a male line descendant of 1st Duke of Braganza. His father was Dom Afonso Miguel de Portugal e Castro (1748–1802), 4th Marques de Valença, 11th Conde de Vimioso, governor of Bahia and descendant of Francisco de Portugal e Castro (1480–1549), 1st Conde de Vimisio.

His mother was Maria Teles da Silva (1758–1804), daughter of Manuel Teles da Silva (1727–1789), 6th Conde de Vilar Maior, and his 2nd wife Eugénia de Menezes da Silva (1731–1788), 2nd Marquesa de Penalva & 6th Condessa de Tarouca.

References

19th-century Portuguese people
Jose Bernardino
Prime Ministers of Portugal
1780 births
1840 deaths

Portuguese nobility